Billy Yank or Billy Yankee is the personification of the United States soldier (volunteer or Regular) during the American Civil War. The latter part of the name is derived from Yankee, previously a term for New Englanders, and possibly deriving from a term for Dutch settlers of New Netherland before that, extended by American Southerners to refer to Americans from above the Mason-Dixon Line (and by the British to refer to anyone from the United States). Although little evidence exists to suggest that the name was used widely during the Civil War, unlike its rebel counterpart Johnny Reb, early 20th century political cartoonists introduced 'Billy Yank' to symbolize U.S. combatants in the American Civil War of the 1860s.

Billy Yank is usually pictured wearing a regulation U.S. Army blue wool uniform that included the fatigue blouse, a light-weight wool coat with an inside pocket and four brass buttons on the front, with a kepi-style forage cap made of wool broadcloth with a rounded, flat top, cotton lining, and leather visor.

See also

Johnny Reb
Johnny Reb & Billy Yank, 1905 novel
Johnny Reb and Billy Yank (comic strip)

References

External links

Johnny Reb and Billy Yank: Culture and Tactics in the Civil War
Johnny Reb and Billy Yank
The Union Soldier

Yank, Billy
Yank, Billy
Yank, Billy
American mascots
Yank, Billy
American folklore
Yank, Billy
Personifications of country subdivisions